F. Mansfield and Sons Co. (SP-691), sometimes seen as Mansfield & Sons Co., was a United States Navy mine sweeper serving in non-commissioned status, thus not properly bearing the U.S.S. prefix, from 1917 to 1919. The vessel was a small commercial freighter that was acquired by the Navy for World War I service. After the war the vessel was transferred to the United States Lighthouse Service for operation as a tender on 28 October 1919 and renamed Shrub. Upon merger of that service with the U.S. Coast Guard the vessel was designated the buoy tender USCGS Shrub (WAGL 244) until 1947.

Commercial service
F. Mansfield and Sons Co. was built as a wood hulled commercial steam vessel by William G. Abbott Shipbuilding Co., Milford, Delaware in 1912. The vessel's name matches the name of the seafood company, specializing in oysters, based in Fair Haven, Connecticut. By 1916 the vessel had changed home port to New Haven, Connecticut.

World War I service
The U.S. Navy accepted the vessel 25 May 1917, paying $55,000, placing it in service as F. Mansfield and Sons Co. (SP-691) 5 June 1917 as a mine sweeper in the 2d Naval District armed with two one pounder guns and crewed by two officers and twenty-two men.

The vessel saw active naval service along the United States East Coast into July 1919 and then was ordered to new duties in the Panama Canal Zone at Coco Solo along with the minesweeper, and tug  and the patrol vessel  proceeding at "the earliest practicable date and when ready proceed in company by Canal Zone to assigned stations."

USLH and Coast Guard service
F. Mansfield and Sons Co. was transferred to the United States Lighthouse Service on 28 October 1919, renamed Shrub, to be used as a tender. Shrub is shown as being stationed in Boston in 1921. On merger of the Lighthouse Service with the United States Coast Guard the tender became USCGS Shrub (WAGL 244). Shrub, operating out of the Chelsea, Massachusetts base for normal tending aids to navigation early in the war, was attached to the First Naval District, arriving 1 October 1944 for additional rescue and salvage duty.

The vessel was apparently disposed of by the Coast Guard in 1947 and sold commercially.

References

External links
SP-691 F. Mansfield and Sons Co. at NavSource Online: Section Patrol Craft (SP) and Civilian Vessels (ID) Index

1912 ships
Minesweepers of the United States Navy
World War I minesweepers of the United States
Lighthouse tenders of the United States
Ships of the United States Coast Guard